Agios Nikolaos is a village in the municipality of Filiates, Thesprotia, Greece. It is situated in the forested mountains near the Albanian border. The river Kalpakioti flows east of the village. In 2011 its population was 78. It is 3 km southeast of the Albanian border, 12 km north of Filiates town, 23 km northeast of Igoumenitsa, 33 km southeast of Sarandë (Albania) and 45 km west of Ioannina.

Population

See also

List of settlements in Thesprotia

External links
Agios Nikolaos at the GTP Travel Pages

References

Populated places in Thesprotia